Minara Resources Pty Ltd is one of the major mining companies of Australia, specializing in the mining of cobalt and nickel. It is wholly owned by the Swiss commodities trading firm, Glencore as of November 2011. Minara operates the Murrin Murrin Mine located in the north-east Goldfields region of Western Australia which is one of the top ten nickel mines in Australia.

Based in Perth, Minara Resources was founded in 1994 as the successor to Anaconda Nickel Ltd. which was founded by Fortescue Metals Group chief Andrew Forrest. In 2006, it had a market capitalization of approximately $1.3 billion. At the time of takeover, it was valued at a total of A$1.02 billion. Minara applied on October 14, 2011, to have its stock suspended from trading on the Australian Stock Exchange.

Key personnel 
Prior to its full takeover by Glencore, its board of directors as of February 2010 were:
 Peter Coates – chairman
 Peter Johnston – CEO and managing director
 John Morrison – non-executive director
 Ivan Glasenberg – non-executive director
 Willy Strothotte – non-executive director
 Malcolm Macpherson – non-executive director
 Marc Ocskay – alternate non-executive director

References

External links 
 

Mining companies of Australia
Companies based in Perth, Western Australia
Nickel mining companies
1994 establishments in Australia
2011 disestablishments in Australia
Glencore